Belkacem Zeghmati (born 2 January 1957) is an Algerian politician who served as Minister of Justice and Keeper of the Seals from 2019 to 2021.

References

1957 births
Living people
21st-century Algerian politicians
Justice ministers of Algeria
Place of birth missing (living people)